Pirates of the Prairie is a 1942 Western film inspired by the Banditti of the Prairie.

Plot summary

Cast
 Tim Holt as Deputy Marshal Larry Durant
 Cliff Edwards as Ike (as Cliff 'Ukulele Ike' Edwards)
 Nell O'Day as Helen Spencer
 John Elliott as John Spencer (as John H. Elliott)
 Roy Barcroft as Lew Harmon
 Karl Hackett as Rufe Jackson
 Ed Cassidy as Chief Surveyor Allen (as Edward Cassidy)
 Charles King as Henchman Layton

References

External links
 
 
 
 

1942 films
American Western (genre) films
1942 Western (genre) films
Films produced by Bert Gilroy
Films directed by Howard Bretherton
RKO Pictures films
American black-and-white films
Films scored by Paul Sawtell
1940s American films